Raimundo Infante Rencoret (2 February 1928 – 7 September 1986) was a Chilean football forward who played for Chile in the 1950 FIFA World Cup. He also played for Club Deportivo Universidad Católica.

Career
A historical player of Universidad Católica, he is one of the most prolific goalscorer in the club history with 113 goals. He also had stints in France with FC Rouen (1951) and Venezuela with Deportivo Vasco (1953).

At international level, he made 13 appearances and scored three goals for the Chile national team from 1947 to 1950.

Personal life
Infante joined Club Deportivo Universidad Católica in 1946 being a student of architecture at the university of the same name.

At the same time he was a football player, he was a renowned painter who promoted the abstract art alongside fellows such as Pablo Buchard Jr., Alfonso Luco and Emilio Hermansen under the influence of Joan Miró, according to the book Historia de la pintura chilena (History of Chilean painting). 

Following his retiremeent as a football player, he went on a career as professor.

References

External links
FIFA profile
Raimundo Infante at ArchivoHistorico.uc.cl 

1928 births
1986 deaths
Footballers from Santiago
Chilean footballers
Chilean expatriate footballers
Chile international footballers
Association football forwards
Chilean Primera División players
Primera B de Chile players
Club Deportivo Universidad Católica footballers
Ligue 2 players
FC Rouen players
Venezuelan Primera División players
Chilean expatriate sportspeople in France
Chilean expatriate sportspeople in Venezuela
Expatriate footballers in France
Expatriate footballers in Venezuela
1950 FIFA World Cup players
Chilean male painters
20th-century Chilean painters
20th-century Chilean architects